Séance on a Wet Afternoon is an opera in two acts by Stephen Schwartz to a libretto by the composer, based on the novel by Mark McShane and the screenplay by Bryan Forbes to the 1964 film of the same name. The work, Schwartz's first opera after a string of Broadway musicals (Godspell, Pippin, Wicked), premiered on 26 September 2009 at the Granada Theatre of Opera Santa Barbara which commissioned the work. The work lasts for about 2 hours 50 minutes.

Performances
The work received its New York debut at the New York City Opera in April 2011, this time with an additional aria for the character of Myra in act 2. It was scheduled for an Australian premiere in 2012 at Opera Queensland; both companies were co-producers of the Santa Barbara staging. That project was however shelved in late 2011.

Roles

Synopsis

References

External links
"Séance on a Wet Afternoon – Stephen Schwartz's First Opera"
Séance on a Wet Afternoon review by Bob Verini, Variety (26 September 2009)
"Opera review: Séance on a Wet Afternoon at Opera Santa Barbara" by Josef Woodard, Los Angeles Times (27 September 2009)

Operas
2009 operas
English-language operas
Operas based on films
Operas based on novels
Operas set in the United States
Musicals by Stephen Schwartz